Two military engagements are known as the Battle of Liegnitz or Battle of Legnica after the Silesian town of Liegnitz - Legnica, in south-western Poland:
 The Battle of Legnica (1241) was a battle in the Mongol invasion of Europe 
 The  was a battle in the Thirty Years' War
 The Battle of Liegnitz (1760) was a battle in the Seven Years' War